Albert Humphrey may refer to:
 Al Humphrey (1886–1961), baseball player
 Albert S. Humphrey (1926–2005), US management consultant